If I Were Single is a 1927 American silent comedy film directed by Roy Del Ruth and starring May McAvoy, Conrad Nagel, and Myrna Loy.

Cast
 May McAvoy as May Howard  
 Conrad Nagel as Ted Howard 
 Myrna Loy as Joan Whitley 
 George Beranger as Claude

Preservation status
This film survives at the BFI National Film and Television Archive in London.

References

External links

Lantern slide (archived; worthpoint)

1927 films
1927 comedy films
1920s English-language films
American silent feature films
Silent American comedy films
Films directed by Roy Del Ruth
Warner Bros. films
American black-and-white films
1920s American films